Yin Liping (July 1908 – September 8, 1984) was a People's Republic of China politician. He was born in Xingguo County, Jiangxi Province. He joined the Chinese Workers' and Peasants' Red Army in 1930 and the Chinese Communist Party in 1931. He was CPPCC Committee Chairman of Guangdong Province.

References

1908 births
1984 deaths
People's Republic of China politicians from Jiangxi
Chinese Communist Party politicians from Jiangxi
Political office-holders in Guangdong
Politicians from Ganzhou